Mark Vincent (born 4 September 1993) is an Australian tenor. Vincent won the third season of Australia's Got Talent in 2009 and signed with Sony Music Australia immediately after. As of 2018, Vincent has released seven studio albums and one "best of".

History 
Vincent was born in Caringbah, New South Wales.

In February 2009, Vincent appeared on the third season of Australia's Got Talent singing "Nessun Dorma". On 22 April 2009, Vincent was declared the winner and immediately signed with Sony Music Australia. Vincent released his debut studio album, My Dream – Mio Visione in July 2009. The album peaked at number 2 on the ARIA Charts and was certified platinum. In 2010, Vincent released Compass which peaked at number 5 and The Great Tenor Songbook which peaked at number 18.

In 2011, Vincent released his fourth album, Songs from the Heart which peaked at number 10. In 2013, Vincent released The Quartet Sessions, followed by Best So Far in April 2014. In 2014, Vincent made his music theatre debut in the highly acclaimed Australian production of Dirty Dancing, which played 130 shows around the country.

Vincent's sixth studio album was a collaborative released with Marina Prior in 2016. The album debuted at number 5. Vincent and Prior toured the album. Vincent performed at Carols in the Domain in Sydney for the eighth consecutive year on 18 December 2016.[6]

In April 2017, Vincent released his seventh studio album, A Tribute to Mario Lanza. In May 2017, Vincent played the role of Freddy in the Australia production of My Fair Lady.

In December 2018, it was announced Vincent was among the ten acts who would be participating in Eurovision – Australia Decides in an attempt to represent Australia in the Eurovision Song Contest 2019 at the Eurovision Song Contest 2019 in Tel Aviv with the song "This Is Not the End". He performed the song in February 2019 and finished seventh out of ten acts.

Personal life 
Vincent's main inspiration is his late grandfather, Bruno, who raised him in Sydney and taught him how to sing.

Vincent has said that he would like to follow in the footsteps of his idol Anthony Warlow. He has also stated that he admired opera singers Andrea Bocelli and Luciano Pavarotti.

Vincent attended school at De La Salle College Caringbah and De La Salle College, Cronulla. He hopes to study at the Milan Conservatory, the leading musical institution in Italy where Giacomo Puccini studied.

He is married and is a committed supporter of the charity Save Our Sons, which fights Duchenne muscular dystrophy.

Discography

Studio albums

Compilation albums

Awards

Mo Awards 
The Australian Entertainment Mo Awards (commonly known informally as the Mo Awards), were annual Australian entertainment industry awards. They recognise achievements in live entertainment in Australia from 1975 to 2016. Mark Vincent won three awards in that time.
 (wins only)
|-
| 2007
| Mark Vincent
| Mats Under 18s Junior Performer of the Year
| 
|-
| 2008
| Mark Vincent
| Johnny O'Keefe Encouragement Award
| 
|-
| 2016
| Mark Vincent
| Vocalist of the Year
| 
|-

References

External links 
 

1993 births
21st-century Australian singers
21st-century Australian male singers
Australian Institute of Music alumni
Australian people of Italian descent
Australian tenors
Australia's Got Talent winners
Living people
Opera crossover singers
People educated at De La Salle College, Cronulla
People from the Sutherland Shire
Musicians from Sydney
Sony Music Australia artists